In the Philippines, Filipino Mestizo (Filipino/), or colloquially Tisoy, is a name used to refer to people of mixed native Filipino and any foreign ancestry. The word mestizo itself is of Spanish origin; it was first used in the Americas to describe people of mixed Native American and European ancestry. Currently, the Chinese mestizos are the most populous subgroup; they have been very influential in the creation of Filipino nationalism. The Spanish mestizos are of a smaller population, but they remain a very socially significant and prestigious minority.

History

Spanish period

A Spanish expedition led by Miguel Lopez de Legazpi in 1565 started a period of Spanish colonization of the Philippines which lasted for 333 years. The Roman Catholic Church played an important role in the Spanish colonization of the Philippines beyond the preaching of the Catholic faith. Spanish missionaries contributed to education, healthcare, scientific research and even public works. The Spanish government and religious missionaries studied the native Filipino languages and published the first grammars and dictionaries of Tagalog, the Bisayan languages and others. In the earlier period, Roman Catholic rituals were adapted to native beliefs and values. As a result, a folk Roman Catholicism developed in the Philippines. European settlers from Spain and Mexico immigrated to the islands and their offspring (of either pure Spanish, or mixed Spanish and Native descent) adopted the culture of their parents and grandparents. Most Filipinos of Spanish descent in the Philippines are of Basque ancestry Some families still privately use Spanish in the households. In addition, Chavacano (a creole language based largely on the Spanish) is widely spoken in Zamboanga and neighboring regions, as well as Cavite and Ternate. Spanish era periodicals record that as much as one-third of the inhabitants of the island of Luzon possessed varying degrees of Spanish admixture. In addition to Manila, select cities such as Bacolod, Cebu, Iloilo or Zamboanga which had important military fortifications and commercial ports during the Spanish era also had sizable Mestizo communities.

Chinese immigration

Even before the Spanish arrived in the Philippines, the Chinese had traded with the natives of the Philippines. During the colonial period, there was an increase in the number of Chinese immigrants in the Philippines. The Spaniards restricted the activities of the Chinese and confined them to the Parián which was located near Intramuros. Most of the Chinese residents earned their livelihood as traders.

Initially, many of the Chinese who arrived during the Spanish period were Cantonese or Taishanese, who worked as laborers, but there were also Hoklos who entered the retail trade and currently make up most of the Chinese Filipino population. The Chinese residents of the islands were encouraged to intermarry with other native or Spanish Filipinos and convert to Roman Catholicism. Both native Filipinos and Chinese who lacked surnames were encouraged to adopt one from the Catálogo alfabético de apellidos, an alphabetical list of Spanish family names, introduced by the government in the mid-19th century.

During the United States colonial period, the Chinese Exclusion Act of the United States was also applied to the Philippines. Despite this, many were still able to find ways to migrate into the Philippines during the era.

After the Second World War and the victory of the Communists in the Chinese Civil War, many refugees who fled from Mainland China settled in the Philippines. These groups in the 20th century formed the bulk of the current population of Chinese Filipinos. After the Philippines achieved full sovereignty on 4 July 1946, Chinese immigrants became naturalized Filipino citizens, while the children of these new citizens who were born in the country acquired Filipino citizenship from birth.

Chinese Filipinos are one of the largest overseas Chinese communities in Southeast Asia. Mestizos de Sangley—Filipinos with at least some Chinese ancestry descended from the Spanish colonial era—comprise 18–27% of the Philippine population. There are roughly 1.5 million Filipinos with pure Chinese ancestry, or about 1.6% of the population.

Ethnic groups in colonial Philippines

Except for the many Chinese migration waves, the history of racial mixture in the Philippines occurred on a smaller scale than other Spanish territories in Americas after and during the Spanish colonial period from the 16th to the 19th century. This ethno-religious social stratification schema was similar to the casta system used in Hispanic America, with some major differences.

The system was used for taxation purposes, with indios and negritos who lived within the colony paying a base tax, mestizos de sangley paying double the base tax, sangleys paying quadruple; blancos, however, paid no tax . The tax system was abolished after the Philippine Declaration of Independence from Spain in 1898, and the term "Filipino" was used to include the entire population of the Philippines regardless of ancestry.

The Spanish deliberately implemented incentives to entangle the various races together to stop rebellion:

It is needful to encourage public instruction in all ways possible, permit newspapers subject to a liberal censure, to establish in Manila a college of medicine, surgery, and pharmacy: in order to break down the barriers that divide the races, and amalgamate them all into one. For that purpose, the Spaniards of the country, the Chinese mestizos, and the (native) Filipinos shall be admitted with perfect equality as cadets of the military corps; the personal-service tax shall be abolished, or an equal and general tax shall be imposed, to which all the Spaniards shall be subject. This last plan appears to me more advisable, as the poll-tax is already established, and it is not opportune to make a trial of new taxes when it is a question of allowing the country to be governed by itself. Since the annual tribute is unequal, the average shall be taken and shall be fixed, consequently, at fifteen or sixteen reals per whole tribute, or perhaps one peso fuerte annually from each adult tributary person. This regulation will produce an increase in the revenue of 200,000 or 300,000 pesos fuertes, and this sum shall be set aside to give the impulse for the amalgamation of the races, favoring crossed marriages by means of dowries granted to the single women in the following manner. To a Chinese mestizo woman who marries a (native) Filipino shall be given 100 pesos; to a (native) Filipino woman who marries a Chinese mestizo, 100 pesos; to a Chinese mestizo woman who marries a Spaniard, 1,000 pesos; to a Spanish woman who marries a Chinese mestizo, 2,000 pesos; to a (native) Filipino woman who marries a Spaniard, 2,000 pesos; to a Spanish woman who marries a (native) Filipino chief, 3,000 or 4,000 pesos. Some mestizo and (native) Filipino alcaldes-mayor of the provinces shall be appointed. It shall be ordered that when a (native) Filipino chief goes to the house of a Spaniard, he shall seat himself as the latter's equal. In a word, by these and other means, the idea that they and the Castilians are two kinds of distinct races shall be erased from the minds of the natives, and the families shall become related by marriage in such manner that when free of the Castilian dominion should any exalted (native) Filipinos try to expel or enslave our race, they would find it so interlaced with their own that their plan would be practically impossible.'

Persons classified as blancos (whites) and those with Spanish ancestry were subdivided into the peninsulares (persons of pure Spanish descent born in Spain); insulares (persons of pure Spanish descent born in the Philippines i.e. criollos); mestizos de español (persons of mixed Autronesian and Spanish ancestry), and tornatrás (persons of mixed Austronesian, Chinese, and Spanish ancestry).

Persons of pure or mostly Spanish descent living in the Philippines who were born in Hispanic America were classified as Americanos. Mestizos and mulattoes born in Hispanic America living in the Philippines kept their legal classification as such. Mulattos usually came as indentured servants to the Americanos. Philippine-born children of mestizos and mulattoes from Hispanic America were classified based on patrilineal descent.

The indigenous peoples of the Philippines were referred to as Indios (for those of pure Austronesian descent) and negritos. Indio was a general term applied to native Austronesians as a legal classification; it was only applied to Christianised natives who lived in proximity to the Spanish colonies. Persons who lived outside of Manila, Cebu, and areas with a large Spanish concentration were classified as such: naturales were baptised Austronesians of the lowland and coastal towns. Unbaptised Austronesians and Aetas who lived in the towns were classified as salvajes (savages) or infieles (infidels). Remontados ("those who went to the mountains") and tulisanes (bandits) were Austronesians and Aetas who refused to live in towns and moved upland. They were considered to live outside the social order as Catholicism was a driving force in everyday life as well as determinant of social class.

The Spanish legally classified the Aetas as ''negritos'', based on their appearance. The word term would be misinterpreted and used by future European scholars as an ethnoracial term in and of itself. Both Christianised Aetas who lived in the colony and unbaptised Aetas who lived in tribes outside of the colony were classified negrito. Christianised Aetas who lived in Manila were not allowed to enter Intramuros and lived in areas designated for indios. Persons of Aeta descent were also viewed as being outside the social order as they usually lived in tribes beyond settlements and resisted conversion to Christianity.

The fluid nature of racial integration in the Philippines during the Spanish colonial period was recorded by many travelers and public figures at the time, who were favorably impressed by the lack of racial discrimination, as compared to the situation in other European colonies.

Among them was Sir John Bowring, Governor General of British Hong Kong and a well-seasoned traveler who had written several books about the different cultures in Asia. He described the situation as "admirable" during a visit to the Philippines in the 1870s:

<blockquote>The lines separating entire classes and races, appeared to me less marked than in the Oriental colonies. I have seen on the same table, Spaniards, Mestizos (Chinos cristianos) and Indios, priests and military. There is no doubt that having one Religion forms great bonding. And more so to the eyes of one that has been observing the repulsion and differences due to race in many parts of Asia. And from one (like myself) who knows that race is the great divider of society, the admirable contrast and exception to racial discrimination so markedly presented by the people of the Philippines is indeed admirable."</blockquote>

Another foreign witness was English engineer, Frederic H. Sawyer, who had spent most of his life in different parts of Asia and lived in Luzon for fourteen years. His impression was that as far as racial integration and harmony was concerned, the situation in the Philippines was not equaled by any other colonial power:

... Spaniards and natives lived together in great harmony, and do not know where I could find a colony in which Europeans mixes as much socially with the natives. Not in Java, where a native of position must dismount to salute the humblest Dutchman. Not in British India, where the Englishwoman has now made the gulf between British and native into a bottomless pit.

Modern term and usage

In modern times, many of the descendants of the above Filipino mestizos may technically be classified as Tornatrás, but due to the term's obsolescence in mainstream usage, most Filipino mestizo descendants would usually identify as just mestizo or even just "Filipino". In modern times, the descendants of the Filipino mestizos are still very active in the politics of the Philippines, especially controlling the bulk of the country's political families and compose a considerable part of the Philippine population especially its bourgeois, whereas the modern Chinese Filipino community and the few remaining Spanish Filipino families both contribute major shares in the Philippine economy, of which a majority of the Philippines' richest billionaires are either of Chinese Filipino background, such as the Sy family (SM Group, BDO, etc.), Gokongwei family (JG Summit, Robinsons, etc.), Lucio Tan & family (LT Group, Philippine Airlines (PAL), etc.), Tony Tan Caktiong & family (Jollibee Corp.), Ramon Ang & family (San Miguel Corp. (SMC)), and many more, or (less commonly) of Spanish Filipino background, such as Zobel de Ayala family (Ayala Corp.), Razon family (International Container Terminal Services, Inc. (ICTSI), Solaire, etc.), Aboitiz family (Aboitiz Equity Ventures, Aboitiz Power, etc.), etc.

Today, the word mestizo is shortened as tisoy just as is the word Pinoy for Filipino. It is used for all Filipinos with foreign ancestry, particularly those born in the diaspora or as children of recent immigrants.

See also
 Filipino people of Spanish ancestry
 Template:Miscegenation in Spanish Philippines
 Demographics of the Philippines
 Ethnic groups in the Philippines

 Comparisons with other countries
 Casta (comparable caste system in Latin America)
 Indo people of Indonesia
 Eurasian
 Amerasian
 Afro-Asian
 Multiracial
 Template:Miscegenation in Spanish colonies

References

Further reading
 Anderson, Benedict (1988). Cacique Democracy in the Philippines: Origins and Dreams.
 Blair, E. H. and Robertson, J.A. (editors) (1907). History of the Philippine Islands Vols. 1 and 2 by Dr. Antonio de Morga (Translated and Annotated in English). The Arthur H. Clark Company. Cleveland, Ohio.
 Craig, Austin (2004). Lineage, Life and Labors of Jose Rizal, Philippine Patriot. Kessinger Publishing. Whitefish, Montana.
 Gambe, Annabelle R. (2000). Overseas Chinese Entrepreneurship and Capitalist Development in Southeast Asia. Münster, Hamburg and Berlin: LIT Verlag.
 Medina, Elizabeth (1999). "Thru the Lens of Latin America: A Wide-Angle View of the Philippine Colonial Experience". Santiago, Chile.
 Monroy, Emily (23 August 2002). "Race Mixing and Westernization in Latin America and the Philippines". analitica.com. Caracas, Venezuela.
 Tan, Hock Beng (1994). Tropical Architecture and Interiors. Page One Publishing Pte Ltd. Singapore.
 Tettoni, Luca Invernizzi and Sosrowardoyo, Tara (1997). Filipino Style. Periplus Editions Ltd. Hong Kong, China.
 Weightman, George H. (February 1960). The Philippine Chinese: A Cultural History of A Marginal Trading Company. Ann Arbor, Michigan: UMI Dissertation Information Service.
 Wickberg, Edgar (March 1964). "The Chinese Mestizo in Philippine History". The Journal of Southeast Asian History, 5(1)'', 62–100. Lawrence, Kansas: The University of Kansas, CEAS.
 The Colonial Imaginary: Photography in the Philippines during the Spanish Period 1860–1898 (2006). Casa Asia: Centro Cultural Conde Duque. Madrid, Spain. Exhibition catalog.
 Advisory Body Evaluation (1999). UNESCO World Heritage Sit.
 Culture and fertility: the case of the Philippines

Ethnic groups in the Philippines
European colonisation in Asia
European diaspora in the Philippines
Filipino people of Chinese descent
History of the Philippines (1565–1898)
Mestizo
Multiracial affairs in Asia
Society of the Philippines
Spanish Philippines